Yicheng may refer to:

Yicheng (monk) (1927–2017), Chinese Buddhist monk
Yicheng, Hubei, county-level city of Xiangyang
Yicheng County, Shanxi
Yicheng District, Zaozhuang, Shandong
Yicheng District, Zhumadian, Henan
Yicheng, Hebei, town in Wu'an
Yicheng, Jiangxi, town in Zhangshu
Yicheng Subdistrict, Hefei, in Baohe District, Hefei, Anhui
Yicheng Subdistrict, Yixing, Jiangsu
Yicheng Subdistrict, Zhenjiang, in Dantu District, Zhenjiang, Jiangsu
Beijing Yicheng Bioelectronics Technology Company, manufacturer of medical devices